Pitcairnia leopoldii is a species of flowering plant in the family Bromeliaceae, endemic to Venezuela. It was first described in 1994 as Pepinia leopoldii.

References

leopoldii
Flora of Venezuela
Plants described in 1994